The Elk River is a tidal tributary of the Chesapeake Bay on the Eastern Shore of Maryland and on the northern edge of the Delmarva Peninsula. As the most northeastern extension of the Chesapeake Bay estuary, it has served as one entrance to the Chesapeake & Delaware Canal since the 19th century. The canal and river now serve as one boundary of the Elk Neck Peninsula. The river flows through Cecil County, Maryland, with its watershed extending into New Castle County, Delaware and Chester County, Pennsylvania. Elkton, the county seat of Cecil County, is located at its head. It is south and east of the North East River, and north of the Sassafras River.

Course
Little Elk Creek rises near Oxford, Pennsylvania, and the East Branch and West Branch of Big Elk Creek rise to the south of Cochranville, Pennsylvania. They descend through the Pennsylvania and Maryland Piedmont, before reaching sea level at Elkton, the head of navigation.

Tributaries

There are several small creeks on the western shore, including Muddy Creek, Jones Creek, Bull Minnow Run, and Plum Creek. On the eastern shore major tributaries are Back Creek, much of which is now the Chesapeake & Delaware Canal, and the Bohemia River. Small creeks include Pearce Creek, Cabin John Creek, Herring Creek, and Perch Creek.

References

External links

NOAA Nautical Chart 12274
Chesapeake Bay Program Watershed Profile: Elk River Lower
Chesapeake Bay Program Watershed Profile: Upper Elk River
Chesapeake Bay Program Watershed Profile: Bohemia River

Tributaries of the Chesapeake Bay
Rivers of Maryland
Rivers of Pennsylvania
Rivers of Cecil County, Maryland
Rivers of Chester County, Pennsylvania
Rivers of New Castle County, Delaware